Deon Birtwistle (born 4 September 1980 in Launceston) is an Australian former lightweight rower. He was twice a national champion, an U23 World Champion and a silver medallist at the 2003 World Championships.

Club and state rowing
Born in Tasmania Birtwistle's senior club rowing was from the North Esk Rowing Club in Launceston.

Birtwistle came into Tasmanian state contention at a time when his state dominated Australian lightweight rowing. He was down the order behind seasoned national champions Shane Broad, Samuel Beltz, Darren Balmforth and Simon Burgess. It was 2003 before Birtwistle was selected to represent Tasmania in the men's lightweight four who contested and won the Penrith Cup at the Interstate Regatta within the Australian Rowing Championships. It was his only Penrith Cup appearance. 

In 2009 in North Esk colours and rowing in a composite Tasmanian eight, Birtwistle won the national lightweight eight championship title at the Australian Rowing Championships.

International representative rowing
Birtwistle made his Australian representative debut in a lightweight quad scull at the 2002 World Rowing Cup II in Lucerne. He then raced in that same quad that year at the World Rowing U23 Championships in Genoa to a gold medal. In 2003 he was elevated to the Australian senior lightweight squad. He competed in the lightweight quad at the 2003 World Rowing Cup III in Lucerne. Then at the 2003 World Rowing Championships in Milan he raced in the bow seat of the quad scull to a silver medal.

References 

 

1980 births
Living people
Australian male rowers
Sportspeople from Launceston, Tasmania
World Rowing Championships medalists for Australia